George Campbell Pidgeon (March 2, 1872 – June 15, 1971) was a Christian minister, first in the Presbyterian Church in Canada and then in the United Church of Canada, as well as the last Moderator of the Presbyterian Church before amalgamation and the first Moderator of the newly formed United Church of Canada. He was a strong proponent of the proposed union of churches and later in life championed ecumenism.
  
Pidgeon was ordained by the Presbyterian Church in 1894 and earned his Doctor of Divinity degree from Montreal's Presbyterian College. His first posting was at Montreal West Presbyterian Church (now Montreal West United Church). He then moved to the Toronto area, serving first in the Streetsville area (now Mississauga), before moving to the West Toronto Junction area.

From 1909 to 1915, he left pastoral ministry to teach theology at Westminster Hall in Vancouver. He then returned to Toronto in 1916, where he served as minister of Bloor Street Presbyterian (now Bloor Street United Church).

He became Moderator of the Presbyterian Church in 1925, and was a strong proponent of the proposed church union between the Presbyterian, Methodist and Congregationalist Churches in Canada. However, a substantial minority of Presbyterians remained opposed to church union. Their threat to the entire project was resolved by giving individual Presbyterian congregations the right to vote on whether to enter or remain outside the United Church. In the end, 302 out of 4,509 congregations of the Presbyterian Church (211 from southern Ontario) chose to reconstitute themselves as a "continuing" Presbyterian Church in Canada.

With the pro-union support of the majority of Presbyterian congregations now guaranteed, The United Church of Canada was inaugurated at a large worship service at Toronto's Arena Gardens on June 10, 1925.

The ecumenical tone of the new church was set at the first General Council in 1925. The former Methodist General Superintendent Samuel Dwight Chown was considered the leading candidate to become the first Moderator because the Methodist Church made up the largest segment of the new United Church. However, in a surprise move, Chown stepped aside in favour of Pidgeon in the hopes that this would strengthen the resolve of the Presbyterians who had chosen to join the new Church. As first Moderator of the United Church of Canada, Pidgeon served for one year.

Pidgeon was a supporter of the temperance movement, home missionary service and later in life, was one of the driving forces behind the formation of ecumenical organizations such as the Canadian Council of Churches in 1945 and the World Council of Churches in 1946.

He served as minister of Bloor Street United Church for 32 years, retiring in 1948. He died in 1971 at the age of 99.

References

1872 births
1971 deaths
Ministers of the United Church of Canada
Moderators of the United Church of Canada